Magnus Kihlberg (born 25 October 1973 in Örebro) is a former Swedish football midfielder. After playing for two local clubs, he joined Örgryte IS in 1995 before moving to Norwegian club Lillestrøm SK in 1997. He then moved on to Molde FK in 2002 before going back to Sweden and IFK Göteborg for the 2006 season. After just one season in Sweden he returned to Norway when he signed for Aalesunds FK in December 2006. Kihlberg ended his career with four seasons at Örebro, retiring in 2011.

Clubs
 Karlslunds IF, BK Forward (-1995)
 Örgryte IS (1995–96)
 Lillestrøm SK (1997–2002)
 Molde FK (2002–05)
 IFK Göteborg (2006)
 Aalesunds FK (2007–08)
 Örebro SK (2008–11)

External links

Magnus Kihlberg at TV 2

1973 births
Living people
Swedish footballers
Molde FK players
Lillestrøm SK players
IFK Göteborg players
Örebro SK players
Aalesunds FK players
Örgryte IS players
BK Forward players
Swedish expatriate footballers
Expatriate footballers in Norway
Swedish expatriate sportspeople in Norway
Allsvenskan players
Eliteserien players
Association football midfielders
Sportspeople from Örebro